The men's javelin throw event at the 2010 World Junior Championships in Athletics was held in Moncton, New Brunswick, Canada, at Moncton Stadium on 22 and 23 July.

Medalists

Results

Final
23 July

Qualifications
22 July

Group A

Group B

Participation
According to an unofficial count, 33 athletes from 25 countries participated in the event.

References

Javelin throw
Javelin throw at the World Athletics U20 Championships